Elizabeth Beikiriize Karungi, commonly known as Elizabeth Karungi NRM (born 5 December 1976), is a female Ugandan politician serving as the District Woman Representative for Kanungu District in Uganda's 10th Parliament, a position she has occupied since 2011. She is a lawyer by profession and a member of the National Resistance Movement (NRM) party, Uganda's National ruling political party.

Background and education 
Karungi did her Primary Leaving Examinations in 1990 at Kayonza Primary School. She offered her O Levels (UCE) at Bishop Comboni College in 1994 and later her A Levels (UACE) from the same school in 1999. She graduated with a Diploma in Law from the Law Development Centre, Kampala in 2001. Thereafter, she proceeded to Uganda Christian University, Mukono for a Bachelor of Laws eventually graduating in 2006. She returned to Law Development Centre in 2007 for a diploma in legal practice.

Career 
Karungi is a trained lawyer and worked as a Legal Officer at Bwenye and Ndyomugabe Advocates between 2008 and 2011. She later joined elective politics and have been serving as the district woman representative for Kanungu district since 2011.

Personal life 
Elizabeth Karungi is married to Allan Kamugisha.

Controversy 
Following a 2011 report on high travel costs for members of parliament, Elizabeth Karungi questioned the criteria that was used to select the staff that were travelling.

A 2017 report on corruption in Uganda's mining sector in Uganda by Global Witness cited Elizabeth Karungi as a beneficiary of a licence that enabled her to mine and explore for minerals in Bwindi Forest even though it was a gazetted area with endangered species. The report recommended an investigation into her by the Inspector General of Government, Uganda.

In October 2018, it was reported that Members of the 10th Parliament of Uganda had almost failed to debate on the motion for adoption of the report of the Public Service and Local Government Committee on the petition on pending eviction of traders, lock-up owners, special hire operators and taxi owners from Mukono Taxi Park. This was because she as well as her committee chairperson were not in the House to present their report.

In November 2018, it was still reported that court had summoned Elizabeth Karungi on allegations that she had attempted to poison a parliamentary staffer. In turn she sued the staffer and a local paper, accusing the paper of giving the staffer "a platform to publish false and malicious story about her and her family."

Membership and committees 
 Member – Committee on Government Assurances
 Member – Uganda Women Parliamentary Association (UWOPA)
 Vice Chairperson – Public Service Committee
 Vice Chairperson – Uganda Parliamentary Forum for children (UPFC)

See also 

 List of members of the ninth Parliament of Uganda
 List of members of the tenth Parliament of Uganda
 Kanungu District
 Parliament of Uganda
 Member of Parliament
 National Resistance Movement

References

External link 

 Website of the Parliament of Uganda

1976 births
Living people
Members of the Parliament of Uganda
Women members of the Parliament of Uganda
National Resistance Movement politicians
People from Kanungu District
Uganda Christian University alumni